Marijke de Goey (Utrecht, 14 April 1947) is a Dutch visual artist.

Biography
De Goey was born in Utrecht, Netherlands and studied at the Gerrit Rietveld Academie in Amsterdam between 1974 and 1979. Her work ranges from large monumental sculptures to sculptural paintings and small table sculptures and jewellery. She has regular exhibitions all over the world.

In 1985 she received the Art Award of the City of Gouda and in 1986 she was the recipient of the Francoise van den Bosch Award, Boijmans-van Beuningen Museum, Rotterdam. In 2001 she was recognized with the Order of Orange-Nassau.

Projects
Her notable projects amongst others include: 
 1987 Dancing Square, Arnhem, Netherlands
 1992 49 Neon Secrets, Leerdam, Netherlands
 1998 The Butterfly Orbit, Graz University of Technology, Austria
 1999 The Mermaid sculpture for the Keystone Trust, Auckland, New Zealand, installed at Gibbs Farm
 2000 Dragonfly Orbit, Graz University of Technology, Austria
 2000 Cubic Gate l'Arche, Amsterdam; and Cubic Bridge, de Balij, Delft-Zoetermeer, Netherlands
 2001 Marsupilamis sculpture, Heerlen, Netherlands
 2002 Upbeat (in Dutch: De Opmaat) sculpture, Amsterdam, Netherlands
 2003 Wall sculpture and two glass panels at the Royal Bank of Scotland, London, UK
 2004 Mi casa es su casa for the City Hall of Smallingerland, Netherlands
 2006 Acoustic sculptures, Red and Yellow, for the Faculty of Architecture, Delft University of Technology
 2007 The Alchemist sculpture for the Faculty of Geosciences, Delft University of Technology
 2008 Vertigo3, Technical Pavilions, Hellevoetsluis, Netherlands
 2009 The Secret of the Nano, Van Leeuwenhoek Laboratory, Delft, Netherlands
 2011 Reikhalzende Chandeliers, ROC Amstelveen, Netherlands

Bibliography
Schmidt, Maurits : Marijke de Goey (1997) V+K Publishing, Blaricum 
de Goey, Marijke; Mertz, Paul; Schmidt, Maurits; Lewin, Pauline (ed.): Heartline (2001)
de Goey, Marijke: Rake Lijnen (2011) Bergarde Galleries, Heerjansdam

Notes

References
Marijke de Goey Official Site
Exposition Rake Lijnen at Bergarde Galleries
Mermaid Bridge by Marijke de Goey at Gibbs Farm
Marijke de Goey's jewellery at Klimt02

Living people
1947 births
Dutch contemporary artists
Dutch women artists
Dutch sculptors
Artists from Utrecht